Iaora Tahiti is the second studio album by German electronica duo Mouse on Mars. It was released in 1995.

Critical reception

In 2003, Pitchfork placed Iaora Tahiti at number 67 on its list of "Top 100 Albums of the 1990s". Critic Mark Richardson said, "This is sunny electronic music operating in accordance with the pleasure principle."

Track listing

Personnel
Credits adapted from liner notes.

Mouse on Mars
 Jan St. Werner – composition, arrangement, production
 Andi Toma – composition, arrangement, production

Additional personnel
 Nobuko Sugai – vocals (1)
 Wolfgang Flür – drums (1)
 Dono Nkishi – drums (1, 4, 6, 7)
 Bodo Staiger – pedal steel guitar (10)
 Harald Ziegler – lyrics (13), vocals (13)

References

External links
 
 

1995 albums
Mouse on Mars albums
Too Pure albums
Rough Trade Records albums